The Second Lubbers cabinet was the executive branch of the Dutch Government from 14 July 1986 until 7 November 1989. The cabinet was a continuation of the previous First Lubbers cabinet and was formed by the Christian-democratic Christian Democratic Appeal (CDA) and the conservative-liberal People's Party for Freedom and Democracy (VVD) after the election of 1986. The cabinet was a centre-right coalition and had a substantial majority in the House of Representatives with Christian-Democratic Leader Ruud Lubbers serving Prime Minister. Former Liberal Leader Rudolf de Korte the Minister of the Interior in the previous cabinet served as Deputy Prime Minister and Minister of Economic Affairs.

The cabinet served in the middle of the turbulent 1980s. Domestically it had to deal with revitalizing the economy following the Early 1980s recession, reducing the deficit and stimulating deregulation and privatization, it was able to implement several major social reforms to social security, student loans, value-added taxes, public broadcasting and further stimulating Urban development. Internationally it had to deal with several crises such as the fallout of the decision to allow NATO to place the Medium Extended Air Defense System (MEADS) at Woensdrecht Air Base. The cabinet suffered several major internal conflicts including multiple resignations, the cabinet fell 3 years into its term on 3 May 1989 following a disagreement in the coalition over a proposed excise and the cabinet continued in a demissionary capacity until it was replaced with the Third Lubbers cabinet following the 1989 election.

Formation
After the election on 21 May 1986 the Christian Democratic Appeal of incumbent Prime Minister Ruud Lubbers was the winner of the election winning nine new seats and had now a total of 54 seats. The Labour Party of Joop den Uyl gained 5 seats and had now a total of 52 seats. The People's Party for Freedom and Democracy under Ed Nijpels lost nine seats and now had a total of 27 seats in the House of Representatives, following this loss Ed Nijpels resigned as Leader of the People's Party for Freedom and Democracy on 9 July 1986
and was temporarily succeeded by Rudolf de Korte. On 23 May 1986 Queen Beatrix appointed Minister of Social Affairs and Employment Jan de Koning (CDA) as Informateur to start the cabinet formation process. The previous coalition of Christian Democratic Appeal and the People's Party for Freedom and Democracy agreed to continue the coalition. On 11 July 1986 Queen Beatrix subsequently appointed incumbent Prime Minister as Formateur and tasked him with forming a new cabinet. On 14 July 1986 the cabinet formation was completed and the Second Lubbers cabinet was installed with Ruud Lubbers beginning a second term as Prime Minister and Rudolf de Korte as the new Deputy Prime Minister.

On 21 July 1986 shortly after the cabinet formation Joop den Uyl who had been the Leader of the Labour Party since 13 September 1966 announced his retirement from front line politics and stood down on 21 July 1986 after serving 19 years as Leader of the Labour Party, he was succeeded by former Trade union leader Wim Kok who had only been a Member of the House of Representatives since 3 June 1986.

Term

Changes
On 23 October 1986 State Secretary for Housing, Spatial Planning and the Environment Gerrit Brokx (CDA) resigned after Parliamentary leader of the Christian Democratic Appeal in the House of Representatives Bert de Vries lost his confidence in his ability to remain in office after a critical parliamentary inquiry. On 27 October 1986 State Secretary for Economic Affairs for international trade Enneüs Heerma (CDA) was appointed as his successor. On 30 October 1986 Member of the House of Representatives Yvonne van Rooy (CDA) was nominated to succeed him as State Secretary for Economic Affairs for international trade.

On 3 February 1987 Minister of the Interior Kees van Dijk (CDA) took a medical leave of absence after he had to undergo surgery as a result of heart problems. During his sick leave Minister of Social Affairs and Employment Jan de Koning (CDA) served as acting Minister of the Interior while State Secretary for Social Affairs and Employment Louw de Graaf (CDA) was temporarily appointed as Minister of Social Affairs and Employment. On 6 May 1987 Kees van Dijk returned from his sick leave and resumed his duties as Minister of the Interior.

On 6 September 1988 Minister of Defence Wim van Eekelen (VVD) resigned after the conclusions of a critical parliamentary inquiry into fraud was released about the time he had served as State Secretary for Foreign Affairs in the previous cabinet. On 9 September 1988 State Secretary for Foreign Affairs René van der Linden (CDA) also resigned. Minister for Development Cooperation Piet Bukman (CDA) served as acting Minister of Defence until 24 September 1988 when Member of the House of Representatives Frits Bolkestein (VVD), the former State Secretary for Economic Affairs was appointed as Minister of Defence. On 27 September 1988 Berend-Jan van Voorst tot Voorst (CDA), who until then had been working as senior official at the Ministry of Economic Affairs was sworn in as State Secretary for Foreign Affairs.

On 30 June 1989 State Secretary for Economic Affairs for small business policy Albert-Jan Evenhuis (VVD) resigned following a publication in the NRC Handelsblad after he had provided a dubious loan and subsidy and because the cabinet was already demissionary he was not replaced.

On 14 September 1989 Minister of Education and Sciences Wim Deetman (CDA) resigned after he was appointed as Speaker of the House of Representatives. Minister of Agriculture and Fisheries Gerrit Braks (CDA) served as acting Minister of Education and Sciences until the new cabinet took office on 7 November 1989.

On 1 October 1989 one month before the new cabinet took office State Secretary for Social Affairs and Employment Louw de Graaf (CDA) resigned after he was appointed as chairman of the trade associations of Insurance Companies.

Cabinet Members

Trivia
 Six cabinet members (later) served as Party Leaders and Lijsttrekkers: Ruud Lubbers (1982–1994), Elco Brinkman (1994) and Enneüs Heerma (1994–1997) of the Christian Democratic Appeal, Rudolf de Korte (1986), Frits Bolkestein (1990–1998) and Ed Nijpels (1982–1986) of the People's Party for Freedom and Democracy.
 Eight cabinet members had previous experience as scholars or professors: Rudolf de Korte (Business Administration), Jan de Koning (Social Geography), Onno Ruding (Business Economics), Wim van Eekelen (Political Science), Frits Bolkestein (Business Economics and Corporate Law), Gerrit Braks (Agronomy), Henk Koning (Tax Law) and Nell Ginjaar-Maas (Chemistry and Pedagogy)
 Three cabinet members later served as European Commissioner: Hans van den Broek (1993–1999), Frits Bolkestein (1999–2004) and Neelie Kroes (2004–2014).
 Five cabinet members later served as in high-profile international functions: Ruud Lubbers (United Nations High Commissioner for Refugees), Wim van Eekelen (Secretary General of the Western European Union), Piet Bukman (President of the European People's Party), Frits Bolkestein (President of the Liberal International) and René van der Linden (President of the Parliamentary Assembly of the Council of Europe).
 Five cabinet members later served as legislative speakers: Frits Korthals Altes (1997–2001), Gerrit Braks (2001–2003) en René van der Linden (2009–2011) for the Senate, Wim Deetman (1989–1996) en Piet Bukman (1996–1998) for the House of House of Representatives.

References

External links
Official

  Kabinet-Lubbers II Parlement & Politiek
  Kabinet-Lubbers II Rijksoverheid

Cabinets of the Netherlands
1986 establishments in the Netherlands
1989 disestablishments in the Netherlands
Cabinets established in 1986
Cabinets disestablished in 1989